Edith Philips (November 3, 1892 – July 19, 1983) was an American writer and academic of French literature. Her research focused on eighteenth-century French literature and French emigration to the United States. She was a Guggenheim Fellow (1928) and a professor of French at Goucher College and Swarthmore College. In 1932, she published The Good Quaker in French Legend. She served as the acting dean of women at Swarthmore and was later appointed the Susan W. Lippincott Professor of French in 1941. Philips was the founding chair of the Department of Modern Languages at Swarthmore, serving in this position from 1949 to 1960.

Early life and education 
Edith Philips was born November 3, 1892 in Boston, Massachusetts to Mary Durham of Yorklyn and Jesse E. Philips of East Nantmeal Township. Her mother was a school teacher who helped assist her husband's operations. Her father served as an instructor of mathematics and was the assistant headmaster for two years at the Rutgers Preparatory School before opening the Philips Tutoring School in West Chester, Pennsylvania in 1927.

Philips earned a Bachelor of Arts degree in 1913 from Goucher College. She earned a Doctor of Philosophy from University of Paris in 1923. She completed her dissertation entitled Les réfugiés bonapartistes en Amérique (1815-1830).

Career 
Philips joined the Goucher College faculty as an assistant professor of French in 1923. She conducted research in France the summer of 1927. Philips was awarded the Guggenheim Fellowship in 1928 to study "the Quaker as a type in French literature, chiefly in the eighteenth century." For her fellowship, she studied in Paris and Russia. In 1930, Philips, then an assistant professor of Romance languages at Goucher, was conducting an "exhaustive study" on French emigration to the United States where she uncovered much on the life of Louis Girardin, the first head of the Maryland Academy of Science and friend of Thomas Jefferson.

Philips started at Swarthmore College in 1930 as an associate professor of French. She became a full professor in 1934. Philips served as the acting dean of women from 1938 to 1939. She was appointed Susan W. Lippincott Professor of French in 1941. Philips was the founding chair of the Swarthmore Department of Modern languages from December 1949 until 1960. She retired in 1961. Philips was subsequently recognized as a professor emerita at Swarthmore.

Personal life 
Philips' sister Amy was a director of the Newington Hospital for Crippled Children in Newington, Connecticut. Her brother J. Evan Philips was a private school teacher in St. Louis, Missouri. She died after a surgery at Crozer-Chester Medical Center in Chester, Pennsylvania on July 19, 1983.

Selected works

Books

References

External links 
 Guggenheim Fellow Profile

1892 births
1983 deaths
20th-century American non-fiction writers
20th-century American women writers
Academics from Maryland
Academics from Massachusetts
Academics from Pennsylvania
American women academics
American women non-fiction writers
Educators from Massachusetts
Exophonic writers
Goucher College alumni
Goucher College faculty and staff
Historians of French literature
Scholars of French literature
Swarthmore College faculty
University of Paris alumni
Writers from Boston
American writers in French